The Alpha Kappa Mu National Honor Society is an American collegiate honor society recognizing academic excellence in all areas of study.

History
Alpha Kappa Mu Honor Society grew out of an idea conceived by Dr. George W. Gore, Jr., then Dean of Tennessee A & I State College. Representatives from five colleges which already had local scholastic honor societies on their campuses met in November 1937, to study Honorary Scholastic Societies at the invitation of Dr. Gore. The formation of "The Federation of Honor Societies" was the outgrowth of this meeting. The Executive Committee chosen for this Federation was:

Dean James C. Evans, West Virginia State College, Chairman
Miss Georgia L. Jenkins, Tennessee A & I State College, Secretary-Treasurer
Dean W. T. Gibbs, North Carolina A & T College
Dr. W. E. Farrison, Bennett College
Dr. George W. Gore, Jr., Tennessee A & I State College

The original goal of the honor society was to promote and reward academic excellence among African-American students.  Due to its roots, most Alpha Kappa Mu chapters are located at Historically Black Colleges and Universities, though some can be found at predominantly white colleges; today acceptance of new members is race-blind.

A biennial convention is held during odd years, in March, at a rotating selection of universities.

The Society has grown to approximately 92,000 members affiliated with 79 different chapters.  Most chapters are found in the South and Midwest, and the majority are at public colleges and universities.

Alpha Kappa Mu was admitted to the Association of College Honor Societies in 1952.

Eligibility
Juniors, seniors, and graduate students are permitted to join with a minimum GPA of 3.3.

Symbolism
The official colors of Alpha Kappa Mu are Royal Blue and white.

References

External links
 
 ACHS Alpha Kappa Mu entry

Association of College Honor Societies
1937 establishments in Tennessee
Tennessee State University
Student organizations established in 1937